Right Now is the only studio album by American country music band Rushlow, a band fronted by former Little Texas vocalist Tim Rushlow. Right Now produced two singles for the band on the Hot Country Songs charts: "I Can't Be Your Friend" at #16 and "Sweet Summer Rain" at #42. Additionally, the title track was later recorded by Dean Miller on his 2005 album Platinum. "I Can't Be Your Friend" was covered by DHT on their 2005 album Listen to Your Heart.

The members of Rushlow parted ways in 2003, although Rushlow and acoustic guitarist/banjoist Doni Harris, who is Rushlow's cousin, reunited in 2006 to form a duo called Rushlow Harris. The duo released two singles for Show Dog Nashville that year.

Track listing

Personnel

Rushlow
Kurt Allison – acoustic guitar, electric guitar, background vocals
Doni Harris – acoustic guitar, banjo, background vocals
Tully Kennedy – bass guitar, background vocals
Rich Redmond – drums
Tim Rushlow – lead vocals, acoustic guitar, electric guitar
Billy Welch – keyboards

Additional musicians
Bruce Bouton – steel guitar
Eric Darken – percussion
Stuart Duncan – fiddle, mandolin
Carl Gorodetzky - string arrangements
Dann Huff – electric guitar
B. James Lowry – acoustic guitar
Brent Mason – electric guitar
Rob Mathes – string arrangements
Nashville String Machine – strings
Steve Nathan – keyboards
Jimmy Nichols – keyboards, background vocals
John Willis – acoustic guitar, banjo

References
[ Right Now] at Allmusic

2003 debut albums
Lyric Street Records albums
Rushlow albums